Daniel Armand Daoust (born February 29, 1960) is a Canadian former professional ice hockey forward. All but four of his 522 career National Hockey League (NHL) games were spent as a member of the Toronto Maple Leafs. Daoust was born in Montreal, Quebec, but grew up in McGarry, Ontario.

Playing career
Daoust began his NHL career with the Montreal Canadiens in 1982 after three successful junior seasons playing with the Cornwall Royals, where he scored over 40 goals twice, while recording 103 points in his final season in 1979–80. Montreal, believing he was too small to succeed in the NHL, failed to give him much of an opportunity, and he was traded to the Toronto Maple Leafs on December 17, 1982. Daoust was an immediate success in Toronto, scoring 51 points in 48 games in his first season there. Daoust relied on grit and hard work to compensate for his small stature, and became a fan favorite in Toronto in the 1980s.

Daoust's point production declined dramatically from 1985-86 to 1989-90, and by 1990 his NHL career had come to a close. In late 1990 he joined Swiss team HC Thurgau, and he was a successful player in Switzerland until 1996–97.

Daoust currently resides in Markham, Ontario with his wife Julie, daughters Josee and Melanie, and son Eric.

Awards
 AHL First All-Star Team (1981)
 NHL All-Rookie Team (1983)

Career statistics

References

External links
 

1960 births
Canadian ice hockey centres
Cornwall Royals (QMJHL) players
EHC Biel players
ESV Kaufbeuren players
HC Ajoie players
HC Thurgau players
Ice hockey people from Ontario
Living people
Montreal Canadiens players
Nova Scotia Voyageurs players
People from Timiskaming District
SC Lyss players
Toronto Maple Leafs players
Undrafted National Hockey League players
Toronto Planets players